William Bond (1876-1951) was an American tennis player active in the late 19th century.

Tennis career
Bond reached the semifinals of the U.S. National Championships in 1898 and the quarterfinals in 1899. He also reached the final of the Western States Championships in 1897.

References

1876 births
1951 deaths
American male tennis players
Tennis players from Chicago